Harry Steel (April 18, 1899 – October 8, 1971) was an American wrestler and Olympic champion. He competed at the 1924 Olympic Games in Paris, where he won a gold medal in the freestyle heavyweight division. He initially did not make the U.S. team at first, but the wrestler who was supposed to go couldn't. Harry was called up to the team and won the gold medal.

Steel wrestled and played football at Ohio State University, where he lettered in both sports. In his senior year he was the
undefeated Western Conference (now the Big Ten) heavyweight wrestling champion. He was inducted into the Ohio State Varsity O Hall of Fame in 1980.

References

1899 births
1971 deaths
Wrestlers at the 1924 Summer Olympics
American male sport wrestlers
Olympic gold medalists for the United States in wrestling
Medalists at the 1924 Summer Olympics
People from Morrow County, Ohio